is a Japanese manga series written and illustrated by Nekotofu. The series has been serialized online since 2017; it is also currently serialized in Ichijinsha's Monthly Comic Rex magazine since April 2019. It is licensed in English by Kodansha USA. An anime television series adaptation by Studio Bind premiered in January 2023 to mixed reception from English language reviewers.

Plot
The series follows Mahiro Oyama, an otaku living with his scientist younger sister Mihari. One day he wakes up as a young girl, a result of one of Mihari's experiments. Mahiro must now learn to live as a middle school girl, all while making friends in his new school.

Characters

The protagonist of the series, Mahiro was previously an otaku man living with his younger sister Mihari until he was turned into a girl as a result of one of her experiments. Mahiro ends up transferring to a junior high school.

Mahiro's younger sister and a scientist. She turned Mahiro into a girl as a result of one of her experiments. Because of her high intelligence, she skipped several grades and is now in university.

Mihari's classmate during junior high school and a gyaru. She is Momiji's older sister.

Kaede's younger sister and Mahiro's classmate. She has a tomboyish personality and greatly admires Mahiro. She has been friends with Asahi for several years.

Mahiro's classmate. She has an energetic personality but tends to not perform well in tests. She also calls Mahiro by many nicknames.

Mahiro's classmate. She has full boobs. She is interested in Yuri.

Media

Manga
Written and illustrated by Nekotofu, Onimai: I'm Now Your Sister! began serialization online via Pixiv and other platforms in 2017. It also started in Ichijinsha's Monthly Comic Rex magazine on April 27, 2019. As of April 2022, six tankōbon volumes have been released by Ichijinsha. In North America, Kodansha USA is publishing the series in English.

Volume list

Anime
An anime television series adaptation was announced on April 22, 2022. It is produced by Studio Bind and chief directed by Shingo Fujii, with Michiko Yokote as head writer, character designs handled by Ryo Imamura, and music composed by Daisuke Achiba and Alisa Okehazama. The series premiered on January 5, 2023, on AT-X and other networks. Crunchyroll has licensed the series outside of Asia. Medialink has licensed the series in South and Southeast Asia.

Episode list

Reception

Accolades 
Onimai: I'm Now Your Sister! ranked fifth in Da Vinci's Next Manga Award 2018 in the web manga category in August 2018, and ranked ninth in Web Manga Overall Election 2019 in October 2019. The manga also ranked third in AnimeJapan's Manga We Want to See Animated Ranking in 2020, and ranked seventh in 2021.

Critical reception 
In English-language coverage of the series, critical responses to the Onimai anime were mixed. Reviewers generally criticized the premise, lolicon themes, and perceived incestuous overtones, while praising the animation and music, which was near-universally deemed to be of exceptional quality. Reviewers in the "Winter 2023 Anime Preview Guide" of Anime News Network criticized the depiction of Mahiro's body in the first episode, which Caitlin Moore called a "pedophilic gaze." However, Moore and Chiaki Hirai of Anime Feminist said that the manga was not sexualized to the same degree, and believed the anime's production team was responsible for introducing this perspective to the material. Moore also highlighted the potential transgender reading of the premise, and said it would potentially resonate with trans viewers despite the perceived distastefulness. Rebecca Silverman was softer in her criticisms, describing the fan service as "relatively toned down" but stated that the narrative premise was "mean". Richard Eisenbeis said the premise was "horrific," and also called the plot point of Mahiro's sex change provoking a newfound interest in yaoi "rooted in gender essentialism."

Writing about the first episode for Anime Feminist, Cy Catwell called Onimai "fucking disgusting," citing many of the same criticisms as the Anime News Network writers. Catwell opined that the series was not a positive transgender story, being particularly critical of the plot point involving Mihari's nonconsensual experimentation on Mahiro, and found that it made them uncomfortable as a trans masculine agender individual. Catwell expressed that though they had not read the manga and could not speak to its differences, they were "fiercely put off" of reading it. Chiaki Hirai, criticizing the first three episodes, agreed with Catwell's criticisms. In spite of this, Hirai described the story's perceived themes of friendship and gender dysphoria as "relatable and even wholesome," comparing it to Hitori Bocchi no Marumaru Seikatsu, and said that those who were not dissauded by the "problematic" aspects could appreciate the series.

In reviewing the anime for Anime News Networks weekly reviews, Kim Morrissy was more positive, saying "Onimai is the best anime of the season." Morrissy strongly praised the narrative, humor, art, and animation production, particularly the work of series director Shingo Fujii, who previously worked on Precure. They also characterized the story as broadly relatable for its perceived theme of growing to accept significant personal changes, particularly to transgender viewers for the "element of wish fulfillment" in depicting a simple and immediate gender transition. While Morrissy acknowledged the fanservice and story elements criticized by other reviewers, in particular Mihari's forcible feminizing of Mahiro, and disliked some "nonsensical" jokes, they ultimately said that those who were accepting of those elements would find a "genuinely rewarding show."

One Japanese-language reviewer, writing for 4gamer.net, echoed positive sentiments regarding its music and artstyle. The author recommended it to "people who like to watch anime in the middle of the night with an empty head."

Popularity
In February 2023, fans of Onimai sent numerous gifts to the staff of Studio Bind, the production studio of the anime, which series director Shingo Fujii posted photos of in a tweet voicing thanks for the support.

Notes

References

External links
 

2023 anime television series debuts
Anime series based on manga
AT-X (TV network) original programming
Comedy anime and manga
Crunchyroll anime
Ichijinsha manga
Japanese webcomics
Medialink
Seinen manga
Slice of life anime and manga
Transgender in anime and manga
Webcomics in print